Akbarieh, headquarters in Tehran, Iran, is one of the oldest suppliers of pharmaceuticals and fine chemicals and importers to Iran. Established in 1890, the company is still operated by the Akbarieh family. Akbarieh customers are health professionals, and manufacturers of pharmaceuticals, food, cosmetic and feed industries.

Akbarieh provides API (Active Pharmaceutical Ingredient), animal health and nutrition products, cosmetic raw materials and finished goods, and food additives. The Company is the largest supplier of vitamins for the manufacturing of human and animal drugs and nutrition needs.

History
Akbarieh Company was founded by Dr. Ali Akbar Akbarieh MD in 1890 in the city of Tabriz, Iran to supply pharmaceutical products and modern medicine to the local population. The Company moved from Tabriz to the capital, Tehran in 1944.

The business has been carried out and expanded by the Akbarieh family and currently provides pharmaceutical products, ingredients, raw materials, laboratory and hospital equipment to the Iranian market.

Principal partners and suppliers
 DSM
 Hoffmann-La Roche
 Roche Diagnostics
 Bayer Schering Pharma
 Boehringer Ingelheim

Affiliated companies
Damavand Distribution Company. One of Akbarieh Company's distribution companies, servicing all of Iran.

See also
Pharmaceutical industry in Iran

References

Pharmaceutical companies of Iran
Pharmaceutical companies established in 1890